Lophocampa is a genus of moths in the family Erebidae. The genus was erected by Thaddeus William Harris in 1841. It contains around 75 species.

Species
The following are species classified under Lophocampa:

Lophocampa aenone (Butler, 1878)
Lophocampa affinis (Rothschild, 1909)
Lophocampa albescens (Rothschild, 1909)
Lophocampa albiguttata Boisduval, 1870
Lophocampa albipennis (Hampson, 1904)
Lophocampa albitegula Vincent, 2011
Lophocampa alsus (Cramer, [1777])
Lophocampa alternata (Grote, 1867)
Lophocampa amaxiaeformis (Rothschild, 1910)
Lophocampa andensis Schaus, 1896
Lophocampa annulosa (Walker, 1855) – Santa Ana tussock moth
Lophocampa argentata (Packard, 1864) – silver-spotted tiger moth
Lophocampa arpi (Dognin, 1923)
Lophocampa atomosa (Walker, 1855)
Lophocampa atriceps (Hampson, 1901)
Lophocampa atrimaculata (Hampson, 1901)
Lophocampa baorucoensis Vincent, 2005
Lophocampa bicolor Walker, 1855
Lophocampa brunnea Vincent, 2011
Lophocampa caryae Harris, 1841 – hickory tiger moth
Lophocampa catenulata (Hübner, [1812])
Lophocampa citrina (Sepp, [1843])
Lophocampa citrinula (Bryk, 1953)
Lophocampa debilis (Schaus, 1920)
Lophocampa dinora (Schaus, 1924)
Lophocampa distincta (Rothschild, 1909)
Lophocampa dognini (Rothschild, 1910)
Lophocampa donahuei Beutelspacher, 1992
Lophocampa duarteiensis Vincent, 2005
Lophocampa endolobata (Hampson, 1901)
Lophocampa endrolepia (Dognin, 1908)
Lophocampa flavodorsata Vincent & Laguerre, 2013
Lophocampa griseidorsata Vincent & Laguerre, 2013
Lophocampa grotei (Schaus, 1904)
Lophocampa herbini Vincent & Laguerre, 2013
Lophocampa hispaniola Vincent, 2009
Lophocampa hyalinipuncta (Rothschild, 1909)
Lophocampa indistincta (Barnes & McDunnough, 1910)
Lophocampa ingens (H. Edwards, 1881)
Lophocampa labaca (Druce, 1890)
Lophocampa laroipa (Druce, 1893)
Lophocampa latepunctata Vincent, 2005
Lophocampa lesieuri Vincent, 2005
Lophocampa lineata Vincent, 2011
Lophocampa longipennis (Dognin, 1908)
Lophocampa luxa (Grote, [1866])
Lophocampa maculata Harris, 1841 – spotted tussock moth
Lophocampa margona (Schaus, 1896)
Lophocampa maroniensis (Schaus, 1905)
Lophocampa mixta (Neumoegen, 1882)
Lophocampa modesta Kirby, 1892
Lophocampa montana (Schaus, 1911)
Lophocampa neibaensis Vincent, 2005
Lophocampa nimbifacta (Dyar, 1912)
Lophocampa niveigutta (Walker, 1856)
Lophocampa oblita Vincent, 2009
Lophocampa pectina (Schaus, 1896)
Lophocampa petulans (Dognin, 1923)
Lophocampa problematica (Reich, 1934)
Lophocampa propinqua (H. Edwards, 1884)
Lophocampa pseudomaculata (Rothschild, 1910)
Lophocampa puertoricensis Vincent, 2009
Lophocampa pura (Neumoegen, 1882)
Lophocampa romoloa (Schaus, 1933)
Lophocampa ronda (E. D. Jones, 1908)
Lophocampa roseata (Walker, 1868)
Lophocampa russus (Rothschild, 1909)
Lophocampa scripta (Grote, 1867)
Lophocampa secunda Vincent, 2009
Lophocampa seruba (Herrich-Schäffer, [1855])
Lophocampa sesia (Sepp, [1852])
Lophocampa significans (H. Edwards, 1888)
Lophocampa sobrina (Stretch, 1872)
Lophocampa sobrinoides (Rothschild, 1910)
Lophocampa subannula (Schaus, 1911)
Lophocampa subfasciata (Rothschild, 1910)
Lophocampa subvitreata (Rothschild, 1922)
Lophocampa sullivani Vincent & Laguerre, 2013
Lophocampa teffeana (Schaus, 1933)
Lophocampa testacea (Möschler, 1878)
Lophocampa texta (Herrich-Schäffer, [1855])
Lophocampa thyophora (Schaus, 1896)
Lophocampa tucumana (Rothschild, 1909)

References

 
Phaegopterina
Moth genera